The 2001 Mediterranean Games football tournament was the 14th edition of the Mediterranean Games men's football tournament. The football tournament was held in Tunis, Tunisia between 5 and 15 September 2001 as part of the 2001 Mediterranean Games and was contested by 9 teams, all countries were represented by the U-21 teams. Tunisia won the gold medal.

Participating teams
Nine teams for under-21 took part in the tournament, 4 teams from Africa and 5 teams from Europe.

{| class="wikitable" style="width:300px;"
|-
! Federation !! Nation
|-
| CAF Africa ||  
|-
| AFC Asia || None
|-
| UEFA Europe ||

Squads

Venues

Tournament
All times local: CEST (UTC+1)

Group stage

Group A

Group B

Group C

Knockout stage

Semi-finals

Third place match

Final

Medalists

Final standings

References

 
2001 in association football
football
2001
2001
2001–02 in Tunisian football
2001–02 in Italian football
2001–02 in French football
2001–02 in Turkish football